Bickley is a former civil parish, now in the parish of No Man's Heath and District, in Cheshire West and Chester, England.  It contains 13 buildings that are recorded in the National Heritage List for England as designated listed buildings, all of which are at Grade II.  This grade is the lowest of the three gradings given to listed buildings and is applied to "buildings of national importance and special interest".  Apart from the settlements of Bickley Town, Bickley Moss, and No Man's Heath, the parish is rural, and most of the listed buildings are domestic or related to farming.  Many of them originated in the 17th century, and are basically timber-framed.  The other structures in the list include two model cottages for the Cholmondeley estate, a pumphouse, and a church.

References
Notes

Citations

Sources

Listed buildings in Cheshire West and Chester
Lists of listed buildings in Cheshire